The Battle of Pablo Perez was an encounter between the Luso-Brazilian forces under the command of Bernardo da Silveira and the Artiguist forces of Fernando Otorgués in Cerro Largo, modern-day Uruguay. 

The encounter ended with a victory for the Federal League.

References

Pablo Perez
Pablo Perez
Pablo Perez
1816 in Portugal
1816 in Brazil
1816 in Uruguay